The Hamiguitan hairy-tailed rat (Batomys hamiguitan) is one of five species of rodent in the genus Batomys. It is in the diverse family Muridae. This species is found only in the Philippines. is a yellow-brown animal with a long furry tail, weighs about 175 grams, and is related to several other species known in Central Mindanao, Dinagat Island and Luzon. It lives only in an area that's at least 950 meters high, and in dwarf mossy forests less than 10 square kilometers.

It was the last member of its genus to be discovered in May 2006. According to team leader and lead author Danilo Balete, "Hamiguitan batomys is the first mammal to be described from Eastern Mindanao, and the first thought to live only in that area."

This species corroborates the hypothesis that the island of Mindanao has multiple centers of endemism, of which the southeastern highland of Mount Hamiguitan is one.

References

External links

 New rat species found on Philippines mountain, Phys.org, 18 February 2009

Rats of Asia
Batomys
Endemic fauna of the Philippines
Fauna of Mindanao
Rodents of the Philippines
Mammals described in 2008